Bruce Reid (born 1963) is a former Australian Test cricketer

Bruce Reid may also refer to:

Bruce Reid (politician) (1935–2020), Australian Liberal Party politician
Bruce Reid Sr. (1929–1955), Footscray VFL footballer
Bruce Reid Jr. (born 1955), Footscray and Carlton VFL footballer
Bruce K. Reid (1950–1970), South Melbourne VFL footballer
Bruce Reid (doctor) (1946–2020), Hawthorn VFL footballer and Essendon club doctor

See also
Bruce Reed (disambiguation)